Ji Bin (born September 1966) is a Chinese politician who is the current vice president of the , in office since January 2007.

He was a member of the 12th National Committee of the Chinese People's Political Consultative Conference. He is an alternate member of the 20th Central Committee of the Chinese Communist Party.

Biography
Ji was born in Taichung, Taiwan, in September 1966. He graduated from Peking University with a Bachelor of Arts before gaining a MBA from the University of Edinburgh.

Starting in August 1989, he served in several posts in the Chinese People's Association for Friendship with Foreign Countries, including section member of the Eurasian Department, director of the Eurasian Department, deputy director of the Eurasian Department I, director of the Eurasian Department I, and deputy director of the Eurasian Department.

References

1966 births
Living people
People from Taichung
Peking University alumni
Alumni of the University of Edinburgh
Members of the 12th Chinese People's Political Consultative Conference
Alternate members of the 20th Central Committee of the Chinese Communist Party